On August 5, 1993, Hamas militants abducted and later killed Israeli soldier Yaron Chen.

The attack 
On Thursday, August 5, 1993, the 20-year-old private Yaron Chen, who was on his way home from a military base, was hitchhiking at the Rama intersection near East Jerusalem. Chen was picked up by a white Fiat van with an Israeli license plate. Another soldier reported seeing Chen struggling with three Palestinians who drove a white Fiat car.

Chen was shot dead shortly afterwards while struggling with his abductors.

Hamas publicized its abduction and killing of Chen. Chen's body was found before dawn in the burnt-out charred white Fiat van in the village of Beitunia in the West Bank.

Conviction of assailant; release in Shalit exchange 

Fahed Sabri Barhan al-Shaludi was originally sentenced to a life sentence.  On October 18, 2011, he was released to Gaza as part of the Gilad Shalit prisoner exchange between Israel and Hamas.

See also
2014 kidnapping and murder of Israeli teenagers, by Hamas
Abduction and killing of Nachshon Wachsman, by Hamas
Kidnapping and murder of Avi Sasportas and Ilan Saadon, by Hamas
Kidnapping and murder of Nissim Toledano, by Hamas
List of kidnappings
List of solved missing person cases

References

1990s missing person cases
1993 in Israel
August 1993 events in Asia
Deaths by firearm in the West Bank
Formerly missing people
Israeli people taken hostage
Missing person cases in Israel